Wang Huansheng (born 1939) is a Chinese translator. He has a good command of English, Classical Greek, Latin and Russian. Wang was a researcher of the Chinese Academy of Social Science, he is a member of the Chinese Communist Party and the China Writers Association.

Wang is among the first few in China who translated the Homeric Hymns from Classical Greek into Chinese language.

Biography
Wang was born in 1939. He entered Beijing Foreign Studies University in 1959, majoring in Russian language.

In 1960, Wang studied in Moscow State University, majoring in ancient Greek and Roman literature, where he graduated in 1965.

Works
 The History of Ancient Roman Literature
 The History of Ancient Roman Literature and Arts

Translations
 Aesop's Fables
 Iliad
 Odyssey
 Elegiae
 Meditations

Awards
 Iliad and Odyssey – 4th National Book Award (1999)
 Odyssey – 2nd Lu Xun Literature Prize for Translation (2001)

References

1957 births
Writers from Nantong
Beijing Foreign Studies University alumni
Moscow State University alumni
People's Republic of China translators
Living people
20th-century Chinese translators
21st-century Chinese translators
Chinese literary theorists